Miyan Khaf Rural District is a rural district (dehestan) in the Central District of Khaf County, Razavi Khorasan Province, Iran. At the 2006 census, its population was 11,135, in 2,317 families.  The rural district has 19 villages.

References 

Rural Districts of Razavi Khorasan Province
Khaf County